The Feldberg is a hill, in the Ebbe Hills Nature Park in the Sauerland in the German state of North Rhine-Westphalia.

References 

Mountains and hills of North Rhine-Westphalia
Olpe (district)